Sichuan Airlines Co., Ltd. is a Chinese airline based in Chengdu Shuangliu International Airport in Chengdu, Sichuan Province, and is the largest airline in western China, operating mainly scheduled domestic and international flights out of Chengdu Shuangliu Airport, Chongqing Jiangbei International Airport and Kunming Changshui International Airport.

History 
The airline was established on 19 September 1986 as Sichuan Airlines Company, its first flight was on 14 July 1988 between Chengdu and Wanzhou.

The airline was later restructured as Sichuan Airlines Co., Ltd. on 29 August 2002, in which the Sichuan Airlines Co., Ltd. Group became the major shareholder (40%). The other shareholders are China Southern Airlines (39%), China Eastern Airlines (10%), Air China Group (10%) and Chengdu Gingko Restaurant Co. (1%).

Corporate affairs

Operations 
Sichuan Airlines' corporate headquarters is located in its hub Chengdu Shuangliu International Airport in Shuangliu District, Chengdu, Sichuan, and its secondary hubs are at Chongqing Jiangbei International Airport and Kunming Changshui International Airport.

Subsidiary 
Sichuan Airlines owns Chengdu Airlines as its subsidiary, which also has its hub at Chengdu Shuangliu International Airport. Chengdu Airlines was formerly named as United Eagle Airlines, and was changed to Chengdu Airlines to help lift the image of Chengdu on behalf of the city's government, according to an anonymous official of Sichuan Airlines. In late 2009, Sichuan Airlines sold some of its share of Chengdu Airlines to aircraft manufacturer Comac and the Chengdu Communications Investment Group. Chengdu Airlines is planned to become the first operator of the Comac ARJ21.

Branding 
Sichuan Airlines' logo is a haiyan that is soaring with high temperament, symbolizing the company's entrepreneurial spirit. The circle represents the earth and the four wave patterns represents a hundred rivers going into the sea and carrying back virtues, corresponding to the core values of Sichuan Airlines' "truthfulness, goodness, beauty, love", symbolizing that Sichuan Airlines takes off from the inland and connects the stability of land civilization and the outward development of marine civilization.

In addition to the logo, Sichuan Airlines gives emphasis to the Chinese character "" in which not only the character means river or a shortened name of Sichuan, but also that the character is defined as running through and gathering. It means that Sichuan Airlines is engaged in aviation flight and had built a world-class fleet that connects five continents, improving its network radiation capability and opening more international routes to build a bridge between Western China and the world and to integrate the world's corporate vision.

Destinations 
Sichuan Airlines is operating mainly flights in East Asia. (Hong Kong, Tokyo, Beijing, Osaka, Seoul, Shanghai, Taipei, Guangzhou, Lhasa, Kunming, Urumqi, Kathmandu, etc.)

Others destinations include Australia (Sydney, Melbourne), New Zealand (Auckland), Africa (Cairo), Western Asia (Dubai, Tel Aviv, Southeast Asia (Singapore, Bangkok), Europe (Prague, Zurich, Copenhagen, Rome, Helsinki) and North America (Vancouver, Los Angeles), etc.

The airline launched its first long-haul overseas route in June 2012 with flights from its Chengdu hub to Vancouver, Canada. Its second long-haul flight, from Chengdu to Melbourne, Australia, was launched in February 2013 with three weekly services. On 17 October 2016 the airline launched twice-a-week service from Chengdu via Hangzhou to Los Angeles (LAX). In 2016, Sichuan Airlines started twice-a-week flights to its first European destination, Prague. On June 23, 2018, Sichuan Airlines launched service from Chengdu to Zurich via Prague. It was the first fifth freedom flight for the airline. It was also the only airline operating this route with Airbus A330 wide body aircraft.

Codeshare agreements
Sichuan Airlines has codeshare agreements with the following airlines:

 Air China 
 Chengdu Airlines
 China Eastern Airlines>
 China Express Airlines
 China Southern Airlines
 Juneyao Airlines
 Kunming Airlines
 Shandong Airlines
 Shanghai Airlines 
 Shenzhen Airlines 
 Tibet Airlines
 XiamenAir

Fleet

Current fleet 

, Sichuan Airlines operates an all-Airbus fleet consisting of the following aircraft:

Special Liveries

Former fleet

Golden Panda 
The Golden Panda Club is a frequent-flyer program launched by Sichuan Airlines. It can accumulate every flight mileage and enjoy free tickets and other product rewards. When the mileage reaches a certain standard, it can be upgraded to a VIP member and enjoy free upgrades. Free first class lounge waiting, free baggage allowance and other value-added services.

Accidents
 On 24 January 2003, Sichuan Airlines Flight 434, an Embraer EMB-145 from Chongqing Jiangbei International Airport to Chengdu Shuangliu International Airport, one man attempted to hijack the airplane and ignited home-made explosives, which injured a passenger and also himself. He was subdued by a security officer.

 On 14 May 2018, Sichuan Airlines Flight 8633, an Airbus A319 from Chongqing Jiangbei International Airport to Lhasa Gonggar Airport, diverted to Chengdu Shuangliu International Airport after a windshield on the copilot's side of the cockpit blew off, intrinsically similar to the 1990 British Airways Flight 5390 Incident, resulting in a loss of a part of the flight control panel. The flight crew made a difficult landing with decompression failure and extremely low temperature. The copilot and a flight attendant were reported injured. Later the incident was adapted into the film "The Captain (2019 film)".

Incidents
 On April 10, 2022, a pilot was revealed to have posted inappropriate remarks on Weibo. Some netizens have caused great concern after the incident was revealed. In response, Sichuan Airlines responded on April 10 that the pilot is currently under investigation by relevant departments.

See also 
Civil aviation in China
List of airlines of China
List of airports in China
List of companies of China
Transport in China
The Captain (2019 film)

References

External links

Official website

Airlines established in 1986
Airlines of China
Chinese brands
Companies based in Chengdu
Government-owned companies of China
Transport in Sichuan
Chinese companies established in 1986